James Davidson Gibson (12 June 1901 – 1 January 1978) was a Scottish footballer who played for Kirkintilloch Rob Roy, Ashfield, Partick Thistle and Aston Villa. His career spanned 19 years, from 1917 to 1936.

Career
Gibson played right-half and was regarded as one of the best players in that position at that time. He played almost 200 games for Partick before a transfer to Aston Villa for a then-record fee of £7,500. He made 227 appearances for Aston Villa, during which time they were runners-up in the Football League twice (1930–31 and 1932–33) but were relegated in his final season with the club, 1935–36.

He was capped eight times by Scotland; The highlight of his career was when he partnered Jimmy McMullan (his former Partick Thistle teammate) in the dominant Scottish midfield of the "Wembley Wizards" that defeated England 5–1 in 1928. He also played twice for the Scottish Football League XI.

Personal life
His father Neilly Gibson was also a Scottish international, who too played for  Partick Thistle though mainly for Rangers, while brothers Neil and Willie were also footballers.

References

External links 

1901 births
1978 deaths
Scottish footballers
Scotland international footballers
Sportspeople from Larkhall
Partick Thistle F.C. players
Aston Villa F.C. players
Scottish Football League players
English Football League players
Kirkintilloch Rob Roy F.C. players
Ashfield F.C. players
Scottish Football League representative players
Association football wing halves
Footballers from South Lanarkshire
Scottish Junior Football Association players
Larkhall Thistle F.C. players